Avangan is an Iranian manufacturer of Electric transmission towers and Radio masts and towers in Arak. This company was established in 1974 by IDRO Group and the Ministry of Energy of Iran. Avangan has 80% of Iran's market in the transmission towers.

References 

Iranian brands
Engineering companies of Iran
Manufacturing companies of Iran
Holding companies of Iran
Manufacturing companies established in 1974
Companies based in Arak
Iranian companies established in 1974
Holding companies established in 1974